Nandyal railway station (station code: NDL) is an Indian Railways station in Nandyal of Andhra Pradesh. It is situated on Nallapadu–Nandyal section of Guntur railway division in South Central Railway zone. It is one of the stations in the division to be equipped with Automatic Ticket Vending Machines (ATVMs).

Originating express trains

References 

Railway stations in Kurnool district
Railway junction stations in Andhra Pradesh